Paris is an unincorporated community in Jefferson and Jennings counties, Indiana, in the United States.

History
A post office called Paris was established in 1820, and remained in operation until it was discontinued in 1841. The community was named for Paris, in France.

References

Unincorporated communities in Jefferson County, Indiana
Unincorporated communities in Jennings County, Indiana
Unincorporated communities in Indiana